Operating systems based on the Linux kernel are used in embedded systems such as consumer electronics (eg. set-top boxes, smart TVs and personal video recorders (PVRs)), in-vehicle infotainment (IVI), networking equipment (such as routers, switches, wireless access points (WAPs) or wireless routers), machine control, industrial automation, navigation equipment, spacecraft flight software, and medical instruments in general.

Because of their versatility, operating systems based on the Linux kernel can be also found in mobile devices that are actually touchscreen-based embedded devices, such as smartphones and tablets, together with personal digital assistants (PDAs) and portable media players that also include a touchscreen. This is a challenge for most learners because their computer experience is mainly based on GUI (Graphical user interface) based interaction with the machine and high-level programming on the one hand and low-level programming of small microcontrollers (MCU) on the other hand while the concept of command line interfaces is widely unknown.

History
The Linux kernel has been ported to a variety of CPUs which are not only primarily used as the processor of a desktop or server computer, but also ARC, ARM, AVR32, ETRAX CRIS, FR-V, H8300, IP7000, m68k, MIPS, mn10300, PowerPC, SuperH, and Xtensa processors.  Linux is also used as an alternative to using a proprietary operating system and its associated toolchain.

Variants 
The Embeddable Linux Kernel Subset is a Linux distribution that fits on a floppy disk for outdated or low resource hardware.

Devices coverage
Due to its low cost (freely available source code) and ease of customization, Linux has been shipped in many consumer devices. Devices covering PDAs (like the Sharp Zaurus family), TomTom GPS navigation devices, residential gateways like the Linksys WRT54G series or smartphones such as the Motorola exz series, Openmoko handsets, devices running Sailfish OS developed by Jolla like Jolla C and Intex Aqua Fish and the Nokia N900 and Nokia N9.

Android, a Linux-kernel-based operating system acquired and extended by Google and introduced in 2008, has become a highly competitive platform for smartphones and tablets. In July 2012, Android's smartphone market share in the United States was at 52%, reaching 82% worldwide in Q2 2015.

Communities
With the availability of consumer embedded devices, communities of users and developers were formed around these devices: replacement or enhancements of the Linux distribution shipped on the device has often been made possible thanks to availability of the source code and to the communities surrounding the devices. Due to the high number of devices, standardized build systems have appeared, including Yocto, OpenEmbedded, Buildroot, OpenWrt, and LTIB.

Platform usage
The advantages of embedded Linux over proprietary embedded operating systems include multiple suppliers for software, development and support; no royalties or licensing fees; a stable kernel; the ability to read, modify and redistribute the source code. The technical disadvantages include a comparatively large memory footprint (kernel and root filesystem); complexities of user mode and kernel mode memory access, and a complex device drivers framework.

Limitations 
Not every embedded Linux distribution is required to or meets real-time requirements. This is particular relevant for safety critical applications and systems.

Projects to develop real-time and safety-critical support are Real-Time Linux (PREEMPT_RT) and ELISA (under Linux Foundation). Real Time Linux project aims mainlining the PREEMPT_RT-version.

In order for the electronic system to run fully-fledged Linux OS and have multitasking it has to have enough operative memory (or replacing such) and memory management unit implementing virtual addressing to ensure compatibility with software running on Linux.

See also

 Articles:
 Convergent Linux Platform
 Linux range of use
 Linux for mobile devices
 Products/Distributions:
 Armbian - specialised for ARM single board computers
 BusyBox
 BuildRoot
 Debian – used on Raspberry Pi
 Embeddable Linux Kernel Subset
 Emdebian Grip
 Familiar Linux
 Google's Android well-known type of embedded Linux, e.g. on smartphones
 Mobilinux
 OpenMoko
 OpenWrt
 DD-WRT
 RTLinux
 Tizen – embedded Linux for smartphones
 Ubuntu - Core and Server, on RPi, x86, ARM
 Vendors:
 Access Co.
 Canonical with Ubuntu Core and Ubuntu Server
 LynuxWorks
 Mentor Graphics
 MontaVista Software
 Wind River Systems
 TimeSys
 ENEA AB
 SUSE

References

Further reading

See also 

 Preemption (computing)
 Safety-critical system

External links
 Embedded Linux course on youtube (Zedboard)
 
 
 Embedded Linux mailist list archive
 Embedded Debian Project  (obsolete)
 VxWorks to Embedded Linux: a Success Story
 Embedded Linux Wiki: A centralized place for sharing Embedded Linux Knowledge

Embedded operating systems